Vaskapu can refer to:

Vaskapu, the former Hungarian name of Poarta Sălajului, a village in Românași, Romania
Iron Gates, a gorge on the Danube River known as Vaskapu in Hungarian
 Austro-Hungarian steamer blown up in the Burgas Bay in 1903 by IMRO-terrorists